Marc Lawrence (born Max Goldsmith; February 17, 1910 – November 28, 2005) was an American character actor who specialized in underworld types. He has also been credited as F. A. Foss, Marc Laurence and Marc C. Lawrence.

Early life
Lawrence was born in New York City, the son of a Polish Jewish mother, Minerva Norma (née Sugarman), and a Russian Jewish father, Israel Simon Goldsmith. He participated in plays in school, then attended the City College of New York. In 1930, he received a two-year scholarship to the repertory theater operated by Eva Le Gallienne.

Career
In 1930, Lawrence befriended another young actor, John Garfield. The two appeared in a number of plays before Lawrence was given a film contract with Columbia Pictures. Lawrence appeared in films beginning in 1931. Lawrence's film debut came in 1933. Garfield followed, starting his film career in 1938. 

Lawrence's pock-marked complexion, brooding appearance and New York street-guy accent made him a natural for heavies, and he played scores of gangsters and mob bosses over the next six decades. Later, Lawrence found himself under scrutiny for his political leanings. When called before the House Un-American Activities Committee, he admitted he had once been a member of the Communist Party. He named Sterling Hayden, Lionel Stander, Anne Revere, Larry Parks, Karen Morley and Jeff Corey as Communists. He was blacklisted and departed for Europe, where he continued to make films.

Following the demise of the blacklist, he returned to America and resumed his position as a familiar and talented purveyor of gangland types. He played gangsters in two James Bond movies: 1971's Diamonds Are Forever opposite Sean Connery, and 1974's The Man with the Golden Gun opposite Roger Moore. He also portrayed a henchman opposite Laurence Olivier in Marathon Man (1976) and a stereotypical Miami mob boss alongside Jerry Reed and Dom DeLuise in the comedy Hot Stuff (1979).

Lawrence played the Volnoth, a member of the Gatherers, in the 1989 Star Trek: The Next Generation episode "The Vengeance Factor". He subsequently returned to the Star Trek franchise when he played Mr. Zeemo in the Star Trek: Deep Space Nine episode "Badda-Bing Badda-Bang", which aired in February 1999. 

His final film role was in Looney Tunes Back in Action (2003), appearing as an Acme Corporation vice president.

Lawrence directed Nightmare in the Sun (1965) and Pigs (1973).

Books 
In 1991 Lawrence's autobiography was published entitled Long Time No See: Confessions of a Hollywood Gangster. Lawrence was also the subject of a novel, The Beautiful and the Profane (published in 2002).

Personal life and death 
For much of his adult life Lawrence lived in Palm Springs, California (1971–2005). Lawrence married Odessa-born novelist and screenwriter Fanya Foss. She died on December 12, 1995. They had two children, Michael and Toni.

Lawrence died of heart failure on November 28, 2005, at the age of 95. He was buried at Westwood Memorial Park in Westwood, California.

Selected filmography
 1932 If I Had a Million as Henchman of Mike The Gangster (uncredited)
 1933 Gambling Ship as Hood (uncredited)
 1933 Her First Mate as Orderly With Message (uncredited)
 1933 Lady for a Day as Nick, Mug At Reception (uncredited)
 1933 White Woman as Connors
 1934 Straight Is the Way as Monk's Henchmen (uncredited)
 1934 Death on the Diamond as Bookies' Doorman (uncredited)
 1934 Million Dollar Baby as Gangster
 1935 G Men as Gangster Killed At Lodge (uncredited)
 1935 Go Into Your Dance as Eddie Logan (uncredited)
 1935 Strangers All as Communist Meeting Chairman (uncredited)
 1935 Men of the Hour as Joe
 1935 The Arizonian as Henchman Who Pistol-Whipped Clay (uncredited)
 1935 Don't Bet on Blondes as Gangster #6 (uncredited)
 1935 After the Dance as Tom, Prisoner (uncredited)
 1935 Little Big Shot as Doré's Henchman
 1935 Dr. Socrates as "Lefty" Croger, Gangster (uncredited)
 1935 Three Kids and a Queen as Gangster (uncredited)
 1936 Road Gang as Pete, Friendly Convict
 1936 Don't Gamble with Love as Gambler (uncredited)
 1936 Love on a Bet as County Fair Barker (uncredited)
 1936 Robin Hood of El Dorado as Manuel (uncredited)
 1936 Desire as Charles, The Valet (uncredited)
 1936 Under Two Flags as Grivon (uncredited)
 1936 Counterfeit as "Dint" Coleman
 1936 Trapped by Television as Frank Griffin (uncredited)
 1936 The Final Hour as Mike Magellon
 1936 Blackmailer as "Pinky" (uncredited)
 1936 The Cowboy Star as Johnny Sampson
 1936 Charlie Chan at the Opera as Unknown Role (uncredited)
 1936 Night Waitress as Dorn, The Henchman
 1937 Racketeers in Exile as "Blackie" White
 1937 Motor Madness as Gus Slater
 1937 I Promise to Pay as "Whitehat", The Henchman
 1937 Criminals of the Air as "Blast" Reardon
 1937 San Quentin as Venetti
 1937 What Price Vengeance? as Pete Brower
 1937 It Can't Last Forever as Hoodlum (uncredited)
 1937 A Dangerous Adventure as Calkins
 1937 Charlie Chan on Broadway as Thomas Mitchell
 1937 Life Begins with Love as Pearson (uncredited)
 1937 Counsel for Crime as Edwin Mitchell
 1937 Murder in Greenwich Village as "Rusty" Morgan
 1937 The Shadow as "Kid" Crow
 1938 Penitentiary as Jack Hawkins (uncredited)
 1938 Who Killed Gail Preston? as Frank Daniels
 1938 Squadron of Honor as Lawlor
 1938 Convicted as Milton Militis
 1938 I Am the Law as Eddie Girard
 1938 The Spider's Web (Serial) as Steve Harmon
 1938 Adventure in Sahara as Poule
 1938 While New York Sleeps as "Happy" Nelson
 1938 Charlie Chan in Honolulu as Johnny McCoy
 1939 Homicide Bureau as Chuck Brown
 1939 There's That Woman Again as Stevens (uncredited)
 1939 The Lone Wolf Spy Hunt as The Henchman In Trenchcoat (uncredited)
 1939 Sergeant Madden as "Piggy" Ceders
 1939 Romance of the Redwoods as Joe
 1939 Code of the Streets as Denver Collins / Halstead, The Henchman 
 1939 Blind Alley as Buck
 1939 Ex-Champ as Bill Crosley, Olsen's Manager
 1939 S.O.S. Tidal Wave as Melvin Sutter
 1939 Dust Be My Destiny as Venetti
 1939 Beware Spooks! as "Slick" Eastman
 1939 The Housekeeper's Daughter as Floyd
 1939 Invisible Stripes as "Lefty" Sloan
 1940 Johnny Apollo as Bates
 1940 Love, Honor and Oh-Baby! as Tony Luffo
 1940 The Man Who Talked Too Much as "Lefty" Kyler
 1940 The Golden Fleecing as "Happy" Dugan
 1940 Brigham Young as Prosecutor
 1940 The Great Profile as Tony
 1940 Charlie Chan at the Wax Museum as Steve McBirney
 1941 Tall, Dark and Handsome as Louie
 1941 The Monster and the Girl as "Sleeper"
 1941 The Man Who Lost Himself as Frank DeSoto
 1941 Blossoms in the Dust as LaVerne
 1941 The Shepherd of the Hills as Pete Matthews
 1941 Lady Scarface as "Lefty" Landers
 1941 Hold That Ghost as Charlie Smith
 1941 A Dangerous Game as Joe
 1941 Sundown as Abdi Hammud
 1941 Public Enemies as Mike
 1942 Nazi Agent as Joe Aiello
 1942 Yokel Boy as "Trigger", The Henchman 
 1942 This Gun for Hire as Tommy
 1942 Call of the Canyon as Horace Dunston
 1942 Eyes of the Underworld as Gordon Finch
 1942 'Neath Brooklyn Bridge as McGaffey
 1943 Calaboose as "Sluggsy" Baker
 1943 Submarine Alert as Vincent Bela
 1943 The Ox-Bow Incident as Jeff Farnley
 1943 Hit the Ice as Phil
 1944 Tampico as Valdez
 1944 Rainbow Island as Alcoa
 1944 The Princess and the Pirate as Pedro
 1945 Dillinger as "Doc" Madison
 1945 Flame of Barbary Coast as Joe Disko
 1945 Don't Fence Me In as Clifford Anson
 1945 Club Havana as Joe Reed
 1945 Life with Blondie as Pete, Blackie's Henchman
 1946 Blonde Alibi as Joe DeRita
 1946 The Virginian as Pete
 1946 Inside Job as Donovan 
 1946 Cloak and Dagger as Luigi
 1947 Yankee Fakir as Duke
 1947 Joe Palooka in the Knockout as John Mitchell
 1947 Unconquered as Sioto, The Medicine Man
 1947 Captain from Castile as Corio
 1948 I Walk Alone as Nick Palestro
 1948 Key Largo as "Ziggy"
 1948 Out of the Storm as "Red" Stubbins
 1949 Jigsaw as Angelo Agostini
 1949 Calamity Jane and Sam Bass as Harry Dean
 1949 Tough Assignment as Vince
 1950 Black Hand as Caesar Xavier Serpi
 1950 The Asphalt Jungle as Cobby
 1950 The Desert Hawk as Samad
 1950 Abbott and Costello in the Foreign Legion as Frankie, The Loan Shark
 1951 Hurricane Island as Angus MacReady (uncredited)
 1951 My Favorite Spy as Ben Ali
 1952 Torment of the Past as Andrea Rossi
 1952 La Tratta delle bianche as Manchedi
 1952 I tre corsari as Van Gould
 1952 Brothers of Italy as Il Capitano March, Un Ufficiale Austriaco
 1953 Jolanda, the Daughter of the Black Corsair as Van Gould
 1953 Noi peccatori as Camillo
 1953 Legione straniera as Sergeant Schwartz
 1953 Funniest Show on Earth as Il Proprietario Del Circo
 1954 Vacation with a Gangster as Jack Mariotti
 1954 Tragic Ballad as Felipe Alvaro
 1955 New Moon as Pierre
 1955 Suor Maria as Don Mario, Proprietario Del Night Club
 1955 La catena dell'odio as Braschi
 1956 Helen of Troy as Diomedes
 1957 Kill Her Gently as William Connors
 1963 Johnny Cool as Johnny Colini
 1966 Due mafiosi contro Al Capone as Joe Minasi
 1966 Johnny Tiger as William Billie
 1966 Savage Pampas as Sergeant Barril
 1966 7 monaci d'oro as "Lucky" Marciano, Capo Da Banda
 1967 Du mou dans la gâchette as Magnum
 1967 Custer of the West as Gold Miner
 1968 Kong Island as Albert Muller
 1969 Krakatoa, East of Java as Jacobs
 1970 The Kremlin Letter as The Priest
 1970 Dream No Evil as The Undertaker
 1971 Diamonds Are Forever as Slumber Inc. Attendant
 1972 In Pursuit of Treasure
 1972 Daddy's Deadly Darling as Zambrini
 1973 Frasier, the Sensuous Lion as Chiarelli
 1974 The Man with the Golden Gun as Rodney
 1976 Marathon Man as Erhard
 1977 A Piece of the Action as Louie
 1978 Foul Play as Stiltskin
 1978 Goin' Coconuts as Webster
 1979 Hot Stuff as Carmine
 1979 Swap Meet as Mr. Booth
 1980 Super Fuzz as "Torpedo"
 1980 Cataclysm as Abraham Weiss / Dieter
 1982 Cat and Dog as Don Salvatore Licuti
 1985 Night Train to Terror as Mr. Weiss / Dieter (segment "The Case of Claire Hansen")
 1986 The Big Easy as Vinnie "The Cannon" DiMotti
 1989 Blood Red as Michael Fazio
 1992 Ruby as Santos Alicante
 1992 Newsies as Kloppman
 1995 Four Rooms as Sam, The Bellhop
 1996 From Dusk till Dawn as Old Timer Motel Owner
 1996 Gotti as Carlo "Don Carlo" Gambino
 1999 End of Days as Old Man
 2001 The Shipping News as Cousin Nolan
 2003 Looney Tunes: Back in Action as Acme VP, Stating The Obvious (final film role)

References

Further reading

External links

 
 
 

1910 births
2005 deaths
20th-century American male actors
21st-century American male actors
American Ashkenazi Jews
Male actors from New York City
Male actors from Palm Springs, California
Members of the Communist Party USA
American male film actors
American male television actors
Jewish American male actors
Burials at Westwood Village Memorial Park Cemetery
Hollywood blacklist
American people of Polish-Jewish descent
American people of Russian-Jewish descent